Natavalasa is a village and panchayat in Denkada mandal of Vizianagaram district, Andhra Pradesh, India. It is located on the banks of River Champavathi.

References

External links
 Natavalasa junction at Wikimapia.org

Villages in Vizianagaram district
Road junctions in India